Vladimir Chabanov (ru)
 Aleksey Chagin (ru)
 Zamid Chalaev (ru)
 Aleksandr Chaiko
 Aleksandr Chekalin
 Sergey Chemezov
 Anatoly Chepiga
 Vladimir Cheprakov (ru)
 Aleksandr Cherepanov (ru)
 Aleksandr Chernov (ru)
 Vyacheslav Chernukha (ru)
 Aleksandr Chernyshyov (ru)
 Yevgeny Chernyshyov (ru)
 Sergey Chernyavsky (ru)
 Yevgeny Chernayev (ru)
 Yan Chernyak
 Viktor Chechy (ru)
 Igor Chilikanov (ru)
 Artur Chilingarov
 Albert Chirikov (ru)
 Viktor Chirkin (ru)
 Kharun Chochuev (ru)
 Vasily Chubenko (ru)
 Yuri Chumak (ru)
 Mikhail Churkin (ru)
 Valery Chukhvantsev (ru)
 Lona Cohen
 Morris Cohen

References 
 

Heroes C